John Montagu (21 August 1797 – 4 November 1853) was a British army officer and civil servant who served as Colonial Secretary of Van Diemen's Land from 1834 to 1842, and Colonial Secretary of the Cape Colony from 1843 to 1853.

Montagu is best known for his highly publicised dispute with Sir John Franklin, the famed polar explorer who held the office of Lieutenant-Governor of Van Diemen's Land at the time. After Montagu's suspension from office by Franklin, he travelled to London and managed to successfully plead his case and find the necessary support to nullify his suspension. Instead of a return to Van Diemen's Land, Montagu was offered the position of Colonial Secretary of the Cape Colony, which he accepted.

Franklin's subsequent removal from office meant he would be available for command of the Royal Navy's renewed attempt to complete the charting of the Northwest Passage, through the Arctic archipelago. The Franklin expedition set out in 1845, and was never heard from again.

Early life 
Montagu was born in Lackham, Wiltshire, the second son of Lieutenant-Colonel Edward Montagu, and his wife Barbara,  Fleetwood. Edward Montagu was great-great-grandson of Lord James Montagu (d. 1665), who was younger son of Henry Montagu, 1st Earl of Manchester. Edward died of wounds in India in 1799.

Army career 
Montagu was sent to England to be educated; he was taught at Cheam School in Surrey, Parson's Green, in Knightsbridge, and by a private tutor. In February 1814, Montagu was commissioned ensign in the 52nd Regiment of Foot. Montagu fought at the battle of Waterloo, was promoted to lieutenant in November 1815, and to captain in the 64th Regiment of Foot in November 1822.

In 1823, having transferred to the 81st Regiment of Foot and then the 40th Regiment of Foot, he went to Van Diemen's Land in 1824, where he became Governor George Arthur's private secretary. In 1826, he was made clerk of the Executive and Legislative Councils, but was recalled to England to take up his military duties in 1829. Montagu resigned from the army a year later and was re-appointed clerk of the councils at Hobart.

Colonial secretary

Van Diemen's Land 
In 1832, Montagu acted as colonial treasurer, and in 1834, was appointed colonial secretary. Montagu was still in this position when Sir John Franklin became governor in 1836, and for five years the two worked in harmony. Montagu devoted time to the question of convict discipline, and in 1841, prepared the necessary instructions for a probation system which was then established.

In October 1841, a strong difference of opinion arose with governor Franklin over the reinstatement by Franklin of a surgeon who had been dismissed after being charged with culpable negligence. Franklin reinstated him because he thought that further evidence showed the penalty to have been unjust, Montagu declared that the reinstatement would degrade the colonial secretary's office, and that if Franklin persisted in his determination he must not expect the same assistance from the colonial secretary that had been hitherto given. Franklin would not be intimidated and friction continued for some time.

On 17 January 1842, in writing to Franklin, Montagu said, "while your excellency and all the members of your government have had such frequent opportunities of testing my memory as to have acquired for it the reputation of a remarkably accurate one, your officers have not been without opportunity of learning that your excellency could not always place implicit reliance upon your own." In the circumstances this could only be taken as insulting, and Franklin feeling there was no possibility of their working together, dismissed Montagu from his office. Montagu withdrew the offending phrase but Franklin's mind was made up. Montagu, however, went to England and so successfully brought his case before Lord Stanley, the Secretary of State for War and the Colonies, that Governor Franklin was recalled.

Cape Colony 
In April 1843, Montagu took up duties as colonial secretary to the Cape Colony, where he did useful work. Soon after his arrival he "ascertained that there was a large amount of revenue many years overdue, and set about collecting it with an intensity of purpose from which even pity for the distressed was absent".

Montagu introduced a system of constructing roads by convict labour, and worked with great energy for the good of the colonies in many other directions. Montagu Pass near George, built by an Australian named Henry Fancourt White in 1843–1847, was named in his honour, as was the town of Montagu. Over-work on constitutional changes which were taking place in the government, led to a nervous breakdown in 1852, and on 2 May, he left for England.

He never fully recovered his health and died on 4 November 1853. He is buried at Brompton Cemetery, London.

Legacy 
Montagu married Jessy, daughter of Major-General Edward Vaughan Worseley, in April 1823, who survived him with children. Montagu, who had suffered losses in connection with his transfer from Van Diemen's Land, died poor, and a civil list pension of £300 a year was granted to his widow.

References

Footnotes

Bibliography 

 
 

19th-century Australian public servants
52nd Regiment of Foot officers
81st Regiment of Foot officers
1797 births
1853 deaths
Burials at Brompton Cemetery
Colonial Secretaries of Tasmania
John
North Staffordshire Regiment officers
South Lancashire Regiment officers